Bibija Kerla (born 23 October 1959) is a Bosnian speed skater. She competed at the 1984 Winter Olympics and the 1988 Winter Olympics, representing Yugoslavia.

References

External links
 

1959 births
Living people
Bosnia and Herzegovina female speed skaters
Olympic speed skaters of Yugoslavia
Speed skaters at the 1984 Winter Olympics
Speed skaters at the 1988 Winter Olympics
Place of birth missing (living people)